"Quote" is a clipped form of quotation or quotation mark.

Computing
 String literals, computer programming languages' facility for embedding text in the source code
 Quoting in Lisp, the Lisp programming language's notion of quoting
 Quoted-printable, encoding method for data transmission
 Usenet quoting, the conventions used by Usenet and e-mail users when quoting a portion of the original message in a response message.

Finance
 Financial quote or sales quote, the commercial statement detailing a set of products and services to be purchased in a single transaction by one party from another for a defined price
 Quote.com, a financial website
 Quote notation, representation of certain rational numbers

Media
 Quote... Unquote, panel game on BBC Radio 4.
 Quote (magazine), a Dutch magazine
 Quote, the protagonist of the 2004 platform game Cave Story
 Musical quotation, the practice of directly quoting another work in a new composition

Speech and written text
 Quotation, the repetition of someone else's statement, beliefs or thoughts
 Quotation marks, punctuation marks used in text to indicate a quotation

See also
 Mention (blogging), a means by which a blog post references or links to a user's profile
 Posting style, quoting the original message when a message is replied to in e-mail, Internet forums, or Usenet
 Quotation (disambiguation)
 Quote, Missouri, a ghost town

 Quotes in English, a ghost town